Leucoma is a genus of tussock moths in the family Erebidae. The species are well distributed in Palearctic, Ethiopian, and Oriental regions along with New Britain and Ireland. It was described by Jacob Hübner in 1822.

Description
Palpi upturned, reaching vertex of head. Antennae bipectinated in both sexes, where branches long in male and short in female. Hind tibia has pair of spurs. Forewings with vein 3 from before angle of cell. Veins 4 and 5 from angle. Vein 6 from upper angle. Veins 7 to 9 are stalked. Hindwings with vein 3 from before angle of cell. Vein 5 from above angle. Veins 6 and 7 stalked or from cell.

Species
Leucoma albina Plötz, 1880
Leucoma aneuphrix Collenette, 1960
Leucoma aristera Collenette, 1960
Leucoma atripalpia (Hampson, 1910)
Leucoma bicolorata Holloway, 1999
Leucoma chrysoscela (Collenette, 1934)
Leucoma clara (Walker, 1865)
Leucoma cryptadia Collenette, 1938
Leucoma dexitera Collenette, 1960
Leucoma dicella Collenette, 1960
Leucoma euphrix Collenette, 1960
Leucoma flavifrons (Hampson, 1910)
Leucoma flavosulphurea Erschoff, 1872
Leucoma fletcheri Collenette, 1958
Leucoma impressa Snellen, 1877
Leucoma lechrisemata Collenette, 1959
Leucoma lirioessa Collenette, 1960
Leucoma luteipes (Walker, 1855)
Leucoma melanoscela (Collenette, 1934)
Leucoma nigrolineata Bethune-Baker, 1927
Leucoma nitida Swinhoe, 1903
Leucoma niveata (Walker, 1865)
Leucoma ochripes (Moore, 1879)
Leucoma ochropoda (Eversmann, 1847)
Leucoma ogovensis (Holland, 1893)
Leucoma parallela (Collenette, 1934)
Leucoma parva Plötz, 1889
Leucoma purissima (Hering, 1926)
Leucoma salicis (Linnaeus, 1758) – satin moth
Leucoma sartus (Erschoff, 1874)
Leucoma sericea (Moore, 1879)
Leucoma sevastopuloi Collenette, 1955
Leucoma subargentea Felder, 1861
Leucoma surtur (A. Bang-Haas, 1912)
Leucoma wiltshirei Collenette, 1938
Leucoma xanthocephala (Hering, 1926)
Leucoma xanthosoma (Holland, 1893)

References

External links

Lymantriinae
Moth genera